Barkahoum Drici (born 28 March 1989) is a female Algerian long-distance runner. She competed in the marathon event at the 2015 World Championships in Athletics in Beijing, China.

See also
 Algeria at the 2015 World Championships in Athletics

References

External links

Algerian female marathon runners
Algerian female long-distance runners
Living people
Place of birth missing (living people)
1989 births
World Athletics Championships athletes for Algeria
21st-century Algerian people